Romani people in Germany are estimated  to around 170,000-300,000, constituting around 0.2-0.4% of the population. One-third of Germany Romani belong to the Sinti group. Most speak German or Sinte Romani.

History

Origin
The Romani people originate from the Northern India, presumably from the northwestern Indian states Rajasthan and Punjab.

The linguistic evidence has indisputably shown that roots of Romani language lie in India: the language has grammatical characteristics of Indian languages and shares with them a big part of the basic lexicon, for example, body parts or daily routines.

More exactly, Romani shares the basic lexicon with Hindi and Punjabi. It shares many phonetic features with Marwari, while its grammar is closest to Bengali.

Genetic findings in 2012 suggest the Romani originated in northwestern India and migrated as a group.
According to a genetic study in 2012, the ancestors of present scheduled tribes and scheduled caste populations of northern India, traditionally referred to collectively as the Ḍoma, are the likely ancestral populations of modern European Roma.

In February 2016, during the International Roma Conference, the Indian Minister of External Affairs stated that the people of the Roma community were children of India. The conference ended with a recommendation to the Government of India to recognize the Roma community spread across 30 countries as a part of the Indian diaspora.

Migration to Germany
They are different Groups of Romani people in Germany. The first record in Hildesheim from 1407. This are the Sinti, the next oldest are the Sastike Roma (Saxonian Romani people). They are different Christian Roma groups like the Lalleri, Kalderash, Čurara, Boyash, Wallachian Roma, Gitanos, and Muslim Roma/Xoraxane like Arlije, Gurbeti, Romanlar in Turkey.
Some People of Roma Background came as Gastarbeiter to Germany, from countries like  Turkey, former  Yugoslavia, Greece, Spain and Italy. Especially Turkish speaking Xoraxane-Roma from Bulgaria, Romania and Turkey, declaread themself as Turks only and are looked as Turks by the Host population. At the Kosovo War in 1998-1999, Romani people in Kosovo, Ashkali and Balkan Egyptians  came to Germany

Notable individuals

See also
 Central Council of German Sinti and Roma
 Documentation and Cultural Centre of German Sinti and Roma
 Ethnic groups in Germany

References

External links
 Romani Rose Giving Germany's Sinti and Roma a Face
 Roma and Sinti in Germany
 Sinti, Roma and Racism: Report Blasts Berlin's Inaction
 Germany: TV discussion Sinti and Roma a concept of enemy: are we too intolerant?

Ethnic groups in Germany